The 1963 Taça de Portugal Final was the final match of the 1962–63 Taça de Portugal, the 23rd season of the Taça de Portugal, the premier Portuguese football cup competition organized by the Portuguese Football Federation (FPF). The match was played on 30 June 1963 at the Estádio Nacional in Oeiras, and opposed two Primeira Liga sides: Sporting CP and Vitória de Guimarães. Vitória de Guimarães defeated Sporting CP 4–0 to claim their sixth Taça de Portugal.

Match

Details

References

1963
Taca
Sporting CP matches
Vitória S.C. matches